The 33 Martyrs Memorial is a memorial in Bingöl Province, Turkey dedicated to 33 unarmed Turkish Army recruits killed by Kurdistan Workers' Party (PKK) militants in the 1993 Bingöl massacre.

The memorial is 13 kilometers west of Bingöl. In June 2007, a 10 square meter Turkish flag on a 33 meters long flagpole (representing the 33 recruits killed in the attack) was erected, along with cenotaphs for all 33 recruits. The memorial was opened to the public in 2012.

Gallery

References 

Monuments and memorials in Turkey
Turkish military memorials and cemeteries
Monuments and memorials in Bingöl